San Antonio de los Baños is a municipality and town in the Artemisa Province of Cuba. It is located 26 km from the city of Havana, and the Ariguanabo River runs through it. It was founded in 1802.

History
There are 39 schools in the town, employing over 600 teachers. These schools include an academy of plastic arts, a school for training art teachers, and the International School of Cinema and Television Escuela Internacional de Cine y Televisión which was established in 1986. The town's library was founded in 1975, and has a collection of more than 32,000 books. There is also the San Antonio de los Baños Municipal Museum.

San Antonio de los Baños Airfield, was inaugurated on September 1942. Initially operated by transport aircraft and bombers Douglas B-26 and Boeing B-29, which conducted training in the Caribbean, no aircraft that was part of Cuban aviation could land at the Military Base without prior authorization from the same authorities .

Geography
The municipality is divided into the barrios of Este Urbano, Centro urbano and Oeste urbano as well as La Ceiba, Encrucijada, Mi Rancho, San Paul, Govea, Pueblo Textil, El Palenque and La Base.

Climate

Demographics
In 2004, the municipality of San Antonio de los Baños had a population of 46,300.

Notable people

Eduardo Abela
Blanquita Amaro
Andarín Carvajal
Silvio Rodríguez
Agustin Roman
Pablo Valenzuela
Raimundo Valenzuela
Mariano Vivanco Valiente
Adrián Zabala

Twin towns
 La Algaba (Andalusia, Spain)
 Jódar (Andalusia, Spain)
 Zapotlanejo (Jalisco, Mexico)

See also
Municipalities of Cuba
List of cities in Cuba
Autopista del Mediodía

References

External links

Cities in Cuba
Populated places in Artemisa Province
1800s in Cuba
Populated places established in 1802
1802 establishments in New Spain
1800s establishments in the Spanish West Indies